Ravi Teja (born 1968) is an Indian actor.

Ravi Teja may also refer to:
Ravi Teja (cricketer), Indian cricketer (born 1994)
Dwaraka Ravi Teja, India cricketer (born 1988)